Sports Park is a metro station on the Loop Line of Chongqing Rail Transit in Yubei District of Chongqing Municipality, China.

It serves Shizishan Sports Park, the park in which the station's name derived from and its surrounding area, including nearby office buildings and residential blocks.

The station opened on 28 December 2018.

Station Structure

Loop Line Platform
Platform Layout
An island platform is used for Loop Line trains travelling in both directions.

Exits
There are a total of 4 entrances/exits for the station.

Surroundings

Nearby places
Shizishan Sports Park
Hometown Paradise Walk (shopping center)
Longfor Hometown (residential buildings)

Nearby stations
Ranjiaba station (a Loop Line, Line 5 & Line 6 Station)
Nanqiaosi station (a Loop Line station)

See also
Chongqing Rail Transit (CRT)
Loop Line (CRT)

References

Railway stations in Chongqing
Railway stations in China opened in 2018
Chongqing Rail Transit stations